The  will be the 58th edition of the Japanese Regional Leagues, the fifth tier of the Japanese football league system. The winners of the first division of each Regional League, along with other three best-placed teams of the Shakaijin Cup, will qualify for the 2023 Regional Champions League, which serves as a single-elimination tournament, in which the winner of the competition will qualify for the 2024 JFL and the runners-up will play a promotion play-off against the 15th-placed club of the 2023 JFL.

Champions list

Regional League Standings

Hokkaido

Tohoku

Division 1

Division 2 North

Division 2 South

Kantō

Hokushinetsu

Division 1

Division 2

Tōkai

Division 1

Division 2

Kansai

Division 1

Division 2

Chūgoku

Shikoku

Kyushu

References

External links
 Hokkaido Football Association
 Tohoku Soccer League
 Tohoku Football Association
 Kantō Soccer League
 Hokushinetsu Football League
 Tōkai Adult Soccer League
 Kansai Soccer League
 Chūgoku Football League
 Chūgoku Football Association
 Shikoku Soccer League
 Shikoku Football Association
 Kyushu Soccer League

2023
2023 in Japanese football leagues